The Frock Destroyers are a musical group with RuPaul's Drag Race UK contestants Baga Chipz, Blu Hydrangea, and Divina de Campo. They made the UK Top 40 in 2019 with "Break Up Bye Bye", which charted at number 35 on the UK Singles Chart. There was a campaign to have the Frock Destroyers represent the United Kingdom in the Eurovision Song Contest 2020. The group's name is a pun on the pornographic double act, the Cock Destroyers.

Career 
The group was originally put together while participating in the first season of RuPaul's Drag Race UK, where as part of the main challenge they came up with their own verses for their version of "Break Up (Bye Bye)". The song reached number 1 on iTunes UK, number 35 on the UK Singles Chart, and number 44 on the Billboard Hot Dance/Electronic Songs chart in the US. 

The group released the single "Her Majesty" on 25 November 2020. Their second single, "Big Ben" was released on 8 December 2020, along with a lyric video. The Frock Destroyers released their debut studio album called Frock4Life on 11 December 2020.

WOW Presents Plus announced a four-part docuseries named "Frock Destroyers: Frockumentary", which goes behind the scenes the trio's performance during the COVID-19 pandemic, and their debut album: Frock4Life. The docuseries premiered on 15 March 2022.

Discography

Studio album

Singles

References 

2019 establishments in England
British musical trios
British pop music groups
Drag groups
Musical groups established in 2019
RuPaul's Drag Race UK